Mervan Çelik (born 26 May 1990) is a Turkish professional footballer who plays as a winger for GAIS. He has previously played for GAIS, Rangers, Pescara, Gençlerbirliği, Akhisar Belediyespor, Häcken, and Fatih Karagümrük. He has represented Sweden at youth international level.

Club career

GAIS
Çelik played for IF Warta and BK Häcken at youth level before joining GAIS in 2007. "I started as a striker but now I play as an inner midfielder and winger. It does not matter if I play on the right or the left, both positions work for me," he said in an interview on the club's website. Çelik made his competitive début against GIF Sundsvall in the Allsvenskan on 20 July 2008, and appeared in the starting eleven for the first time six weeks later against IFK Göteborg. He signed a three-year contract in May 2009, and scored his first goal for the club later that year against Kalmar FF.

Rangers
Having left GAIS at the end of his contract, Çelik was offered a three and a half-year contract from Scottish Premier League team Rangers, which he signed on 20 January 2012. After Rangers went into administration, Çelik chose to leave the club in March 2012 without a pay-off. He stated that he didn't make the wrong decision in joining the club, but the club entering administration was unpredictable.

GAIS claimed that Rangers owed them £240,000 compensation for the transfer of Celik. However, there were suggestions that Celik was not offered a new contract within 60 days before the end of his previous deal, meaning that no compensation would have been necessary. Both GAIS and Celik disputed this and the club have threatened to take the matter to FIFA if Rangers don't pay them.

Return to GAIS 
After leaving Rangers in March 2012, Çelik signed an eight-month contract with GAIS.

Pescara
Çelik continued his career in Italian first league with the newcomer Pescara in 2012. He scored the first goal for Pescara the 2012–13 season against Sampdoria in a 3–2 loss.

International career
Çelik has represented Sweden at youth level. He made his under-21 debut against Norway on 2 June 2011 and scored two goals in a 4–1 win. He is eligible to play for Turkey through his parents.

Honours
Individual
Svenska Cupen Top goalscorer: 2018–19

Svenska Cupen 2018–19]]

Personal life
Çelik was born and raised in the suburb Biskopsgården, Hisingen, an island which forms part of the Gothenburg Municipality. Çelik's parents are ethnic Kurds from Turkey. His mother and father lived in Konya before moving to Sweden, where his father opened a restaurant.

References

External links
 
 
 
  
 
 Celik kan lämna efter succén i U21-debuten at expressen.se 
 

1990 births
Footballers from Gothenburg
Swedish people of Kurdish descent
Swedish people of Turkish descent
Living people
Swedish footballers
Sweden under-21 international footballers
Sweden youth international footballers
Association football wingers
GAIS players
Rangers F.C. players
Delfino Pescara 1936 players
Gençlerbirliği S.K. footballers
Akhisarspor footballers
BK Häcken players
Fatih Karagümrük S.K. footballers
Allsvenskan players
Scottish Premier League players
Serie A players
Süper Lig players
TFF First League players
Superettan players
TFF Second League players
Ettan Fotboll players
Swedish expatriate footballers
Expatriate footballers in Scotland
Swedish expatriate sportspeople in Scotland
Expatriate footballers in Italy
Swedish expatriate sportspeople in Italy
Expatriate footballers in Turkey
Swedish expatriate sportspeople in Turkey